Yonkang Foundation is an academic and scholarship foundation supporting academic, cultural and scholarship programs since its establishment in 1978, to honor the will of the first chairman of Doosan Group, the late Doo Byung Park (whose penname was Yonkang).

Main Programs 
 Scholarships
 Academic Research Support
 Overseas Academic Tour for Teachers
 Educational Welfare
 The Book Donation Program
 Cultural & Art Activities